The Farmers Market District is an area in southeastern downtown Dallas, Texas (USA). It lies south of the Main Street District, north of the Cedars, west of Deep Ellum, northeast of the Convention Center District, and southeast of the Government District.

Notable Structures and Parks 
Dallas Farmers Market
Harwood Historic District
First Presbyterian Church of Dallas
Dallas Statler Hilton

Education 
The district is zoned to schools in the Dallas Independent School District.

Residents of the district are zoned to City Park Elementary School, Billy Earl Dade Middle School, and James Madison High School.

References

External links 
Dallas Farmers Market
Dallas Farmers Market Friends